Ricardo Echarte (born 4 October 1974) is a Spanish judoka.

Achievements

References

External links
 
 

1974 births
Living people
Spanish male judoka
Judoka at the 2000 Summer Olympics
Judoka at the 2004 Summer Olympics
Olympic judoka of Spain
20th-century Spanish people
21st-century Spanish people